This is a list of all the United States Supreme Court cases from volume 534 of the United States Reports:

External links

2001 in United States case law
2002 in United States case law